Moscow Zero is a 2006 film directed by María Lidón.

Plot

An anthropologist called Sergei goes missing after researching a legend about the existence of demons and an entrance to Hell beneath Moscow. A rescue team led by his friend Owen, an American priest, searches for Sergei in the caves and catacombs beneath the city of Moscow which are inhabited by demons.

Cast

References

External links 

2006 films
American supernatural horror films
British supernatural horror films
Films scored by Javier Navarrete
Films set in Moscow
Films shot in Russia
Films shot in Spain
American independent films
Spanish supernatural horror films
2000s Russian-language films
British independent films
Spanish independent films
2000s English-language films
2000s American films
2000s British films